Isotricha is a genus of protozoa (single-celled organisms) which are commensals of the rumen of ruminant animals.

Species include:
 Isotricha intestinalis Stein 1858
 Isotricha prostoma Stein 1858

References

Biological interactions
Ciliates
Litostomatea
Symbiosis